The Moray & District Welfare Football Association is affiliated to the Scottish Welfare Football Association which is affiliated to the Scottish Football Association. One of the biggest welfare associations in Scotland it has 6 club members and is sponsored by Abbeyside Care Group.

2022 Member Clubs

 Aberlour Villa
 Cullen
 Craigellachie
 Hopeman
 FC Fochabers
 RAF Lossiemouth

Champions

Premier Division

References

External links
 Official website

Scottish Welfare Football Association
Football in Moray
Football governing bodies in Scotland
Football leagues in Scotland